Andrea Bermond Des Ambrois (born 4 October 1964) is an Italian fencer. He competed in the team épée event at the 1988 Summer Olympics.

References

External links
 

1964 births
Living people
Italian male fencers
Olympic fencers of Italy
Fencers at the 1988 Summer Olympics
Universiade medalists in fencing
People from Ivrea
Universiade gold medalists for Italy
Sportspeople from the Metropolitan City of Turin
20th-century Italian people
21st-century Italian people